Brückner Glacier is a glacier flowing northeast on Arrowsmith Peninsula to Muller Ice Shelf in the southwest part of Lallemand Fjord, Loubet Coast. It was mapped by the Falkland Islands Dependencies Survey from surveys and air photos, 1956–59, and named by the UK Antarctic Place-Names Committee after Eduard Brückner, German pioneer glaciologist.

See also
 List of glaciers in the Antarctic
 Glaciology

References
 

Glaciers of Loubet Coast